Penicillium guanacastense is a species of the genus of Penicillium which was isolated from caterpillars from Costa Rica.

References

guanacastense
Fungi described in 2012